Mostafa Ali (born 12 July 1989), commonly known as Mostafa Kalosha, is an Egyptian footballer who plays for Egyptian Premier League side FC Masr as a left-back.

Kalosha joined Al Ittihad from Ghazl El Mahalla in 2015 for 400,000 Egyptian pounds. In 2017, he signed a 2-year contract for Al Assiouty Sport in a free transfer.

In September 2017, Egyptian Football Association suspended Kalosha for 6 months for signing to two different clubs at the same time, El Dakhleya and Al Assiouty. El Dakhleya later withdrew their complaint after Al Assiouty paid 100,000 Egyptian pounds as a compensation.

External links
Mostafa Kalosha at KOOORA.com

References

1989 births
Living people
Egyptian footballers
Association football fullbacks
Al Aluminium SC players
El Minya SC players
Ghazl El Mahalla SC players
Al Ittihad Alexandria Club players
Pyramids FC players
El Dakhleya SC players
FC Masr players
Egyptian Premier League players